

B 

B